Zeinab Hamid qizi Mamedyarova (also spelled Mamedjarova; ; born 3 October 1983) is an Azerbaijani chess player holding the FIDE title of Woman Grandmaster (WGM).

Career 
In 2000, Mamedyarova won the Girls U18 section of the World Youth Championships in Oropesa del Mar and took a silver medal at the 34th Chess Olympiad, held in Istanbul. In 2002, she won the European junior girls championship in Baku and a bronze medal at the 35th Chess Olympiad in Bled.

Mamedyarova won the Azerbaijani women's championship in 2001, 2008, 2015. She took part in the Istanbul leg of the FIDE Women's Grand Prix series in 2009.

Personal life 
She is the elder sister of Shakhriyar Mamedyarov and Turkan Mamedyarova, both also chess players. Zeinab is married and has a son.

References

External links 

1983 births
Living people
Chess woman grandmasters
World Youth Chess Champions
Azerbaijani female chess players
People from Sumgait
Chess Olympiad competitors